James Lea Cate (November 16, 1899 – November 1, 1981) was a professor of history at the University of Chicago, an intelligence officer in the United States Army Air Forces with the rank of major, and part of the Air Force Historical Division during World War II. He authored at least two pieces of Air Force literature, one titled Origins of the Eighth Air Force: Plans, Organization, Doctrines, the other titled History of the Twentieth Air Force: Genesis. The former is 143 pages in length, while the latter is 298 pages. Both were classified at the time of their writing, but declassified in 1958.

From 1945 to 1958, with former AAF lieutenant colonel Wesley Frank Craven, an historian with New York University and Princeton, Cate was managing editor of the seven-volume history of the AAF, The Army Air Forces in World War II.

After the bombing of Hiroshima, Cate, as historical officer of the Twentieth Air Force from June 1944, received a letter from President Harry S. Truman which provided a lengthy justification for the dropping of the first atomic bombs ever to be used in warfare, Little Boy and Fat Man.

He is the grandfather of cartoonist Daniel Clowes.

External links
 Air Force Historical Research Agency numbered USAF historical studies, including the two documents by Cate 
 Air Force Historical Research Agency
 President Truman's letter to Cate
 Guide to the James Lea Cate Papers 1925-1980

 Interview with grandson, Daniel Clowes from University of Chicago

1899 births
1981 deaths
United States Army Air Forces officers
American aviation writers
University of Chicago faculty